ELK Airways (abbreviated ELK) was an Estonian airline which operated from 1991 to 2001.

In the beginning, ELK used three Tupolev Tu-154 jetliners; they later used Let L-410, BAe Jetstream 31 and Tupolev Tu-134A aircraft.

On 23 November 2001, an ELK Antonov An-28 crashed into trees located shortly before the runway at Kärdla Airport, killing two passengers. The aircraft was being leased from Enimex.

References

External links

Defunct airlines of Estonia
Airlines established in 1991
Airlines disestablished in 2001